The Morecambe and Heysham War Memorial stands on the Promenade at Morecambe, Lancashire, England.

It has two inscriptions in black lettering, after which are listed  the names of those remembered 

The memorial remembers the 216 men who died in the First World War, the 180 in the Second World War and the single man
who was killed in the Korean War.

The war memorial, made of bronze and granite, was completed in 1921 and designed by Thomas Hayton Mawson. A bronze lion sits atop a stepped base. On 20 January 1993 the monument was registered as a Grade II structure at British Listed Buildings.

See also

Listed buildings in Morecambe

References

External links
 Lancaster Memorials: Chapter 3 Morecambe and Heysham War Memorial (pages 57-62)
 Morecambe Visitor and Heysham Chronicle: Obituaries 1914-198 War
 Morecambe and Heysham War Memorial - photo and map

British military memorials and cemeteries
World War I memorials in England
World War II memorials in England
Monuments and memorials in Lancashire
Buildings and structures in Morecambe
Grade II listed buildings in Lancashire
1921 sculptures
Grade II listed monuments and memorials